Blue Highway is the seventh studio album by American country music artist John Conlee. It was released in 1984 via MCA Records. The album inlucdes the singles "Years After You", "Working Man" and "Blue Highway".

Track listing

Personnel
Adapted from liner notes.

Eddie Bayers - drums
Dennis Burnside - keyboards
Jimmy Capps - acoustic guitar
Terry Choate - steel guitar
John Conlee - lead vocals
Mike Haynes - trumpet
John Barlow Jarvis - synthesizer
Bud Logan - background vocals
Connie McCollister - concert master
Rick McCollister - tambourine, background vocals
Alan Moore - string arrangements
Weldon Myrick - steel guitar
Joe Osborn - bass guitar
Jay Patten - saxophone
Brent Rowan - acoustic guitar, electric guitar, ukulele
Larry Sasser - steel guitar
The "A" Strings - strings
Judy Taylor - background vocals
Dennis Wilson - background vocals

Chart performance

References

1984 albums
John Conlee albums
MCA Records albums